In the study of stochastic processes, Palm calculus, named after Swedish teletrafficist Conny Palm, is the study of the relationship between probabilities conditioned on a specified event and time-average probabilities.

Little's formula
A simple example of a formula from Palm calculus is Little's law , which states that the time-average number of users (L) in a system is equal to the product of the rate at which users arrive and the Palm-average waiting time (W) that a user spends in the system.  That is, the average W gives equal weight to the waiting time of all customers, rather than being the time-average of "the waiting times of the customers currently in the system".

Feller's paradox
An important example of the use of Palm probabilities is Feller's paradox, often associated with the analysis of an M/G/1 queue.  This states that the (time-)average time between the previous and next points in a point process is greater than the expected interval between points.  The latter is the Palm expectation of the former, conditioning on the event that a point occurs at the time of the observation.  This paradox occurs because large intervals are given greater weight in the time average than small intervals.

References

Palm, C. (1943) "Intensitätsschwankungen im Fernsprechverkehr" Ericsson Techniks, No. 44 

Queueing theory
Stochastic calculus
Telecommunication theory